Rade Bulat (28 August 1920 – 25 January 2013) was a Yugoslav Partisan and communist activist. He was one of the last three living recipients of the Order of the People's Hero in Croatia.

Biography
Bulat was born August 28, 1920 in Vrginmost within the Kingdom of Serbs, Croats and Slovenes. He attended gymnasium in Sisak, Gradiška and Zagreb.

In 1936 he joined the Young Communist League of Yugoslavia and was accepted into the Communist Party of Yugoslavia in 1939. After the April War he joined the Yugoslav Partisans. In 1942 he joined the Headquarters of the People's Liberation Movement of Croatia. He led the 13th Proletarian Attack Brigade from late 1942 on. Bulat became commander of the 32nd Zagorje Division on June 6, 1944.

After the war he was a representative in the Parliament of the Socialist Republic of Croatia, and was a member of the Central Committee of the Communist Party of Croatia. He was awarded the Order of the People's Hero on July 24, 1953, along with his wife Milka Kufrin.

During the Croatian Spring in 1971, Bulat publicly called for a Serb autonomous region within SR Croatia.

He published a book about the 10th Zagreb Corps in 1985.

After vandalism of a memorial grave in Lasinja in 2010, Bulat called for the perpetrators to be beaten by whoever found them.

In February 2011 it was revealed that Bulat had been subject of an ongoing investigation for war crimes by the Ministry of the Interior since 2007. The police investigation resulted in accusing him of ordering the killings of Croatian Home Guard war prisoners near Čazma on the night of November 28–29, 1943.

References

1920 births
2013 deaths
People from Gvozd
Serbs of Croatia
League of Communists of Croatia politicians
Yugoslav Partisans members
Recipients of the Order of the People's Hero
Burials at Mirogoj Cemetery